Am ol Deyay may refer to:
 Am ol Deyay 1
 Am ol Deyay 2